Dacorum is a borough in Hertfordshire, England. The term may also refer to:

Dacorum, a Latin word meaning "of the Dacians"
 Dacorum, various Roman auxiliary regiments

See also
 Decorum

Latin words and phrases